Miklós Pásztory (1875–1922) was a Hungarian film director.

Selected filmography
 Lyon Lea (1915)
 The Village Rogue (1916)
 The Red Purse (1917)
 Károly bakák (1918)
 Végszó (1920)

Bibliography
 Cunningham, John. Hungarian Cinema: From Coffee House to Multiplex. Wallflower Press, 2004.

External links

1875 births
1922 deaths
Hungarian film directors